Tranquillity Valley is a snow-covered valley between Hannah Peak and Cairn Ridge in the west part of Dufek Massif, Pensacola Mountains, Antarctica. The name was proposed by Arthur B. Ford, United States Geological Survey (USGS) geologist, leader of several USGS field parties to the Pensacola Mountains, 1965–79. Named from its typical weather conditions, the valley being protected from strong winds most of the time. The USGS snowmobile parties coming from cold, windy areas found welcome refuge in this valley. The name is also in accord with nearby Enchanted Valley to indicate the general beauty of this part of Dufek Massif.

Valleys of Queen Elizabeth Land